Ordinary People is a 1980 film directed by Robert Redford.

Ordinary People may also refer to:

Books
Ordinary People (Guest novel), a 1976 novel by Judith Guest on which the film is based
Ordinary People (Evans novel), a 2018 novel by Diana Evans
Ordinary People: Our Story, an autobiography by Ozzy Osbourne

Film and television
Ordinary People (2009 film), directed by Vladimir Perišić
"Ordinary People" (Lois & Clark), an episode of Lois & Clark: The New Adventures of Superman
"Ordinary People" (The Vampire Diaries), an episode The Vampire Diaries

Music
 "Ordinary People" (Clay Walker song), 1998
"Ordinary People" (John Legend song), 2004
"Ordinary People" (Steve Harley song), 2015
"Ordinary People" (The Box song), 1987 
"Ordinary People", a 1975 song by The Kinks from Soap Opera
"Ordinary People", a 2007 song by Neil Young from Chrome Dreams II
"Ordinary People", a 2018 song by Bugzy Malone featuring JP Cooper from B. Inspired

Other uses
 Ordinary People (Slovakia), a political party in Slovakia

See also
Ordinary Person, a 2017 South Korean film